The 1969–70 Purdue Boilermakers men's basketball team represented Purdue University during the 1969–70 NCAA men's basketball season. The Boilermakers played their home games at Mackey Arena in West Lafayette, Indiana as members of the Big Ten Conference. They were led by head coach George King in his fourth year as head coach. The Boilers finished the season 18–6, 11–3 in Big Ten play to finish in second place.

Roster

Awards and honors
 Rick Mount, Chicago Tribune Silver Basketball and Consensus All-American

References

Purdue Boilermakers men's basketball seasons
Purdue